Daniël Coenraad du Plessis  (born 9 August 1948 in  Potchefstroom, North West, South Africa) is a former South African rugby union player.

Playing career
Du Plessis played for Northern Transvaal in the South African Currie Cup competition. He was selected on the replacement bench for the Springboks during the test series against the 1976 visiting All Blacks, but did not get any game time.
Du Plessis made his debut for the Springboks against the touring World XV on 27 August 1977 at Loftus Versveld in Pretoria.  He played his second and last test match for the Springboks against the South American Jaguars on 3 May 1980 at Kings Park Stadium in Durban.

Test history

See also
List of South Africa national rugby union players – Springbok no. 496

References

1948 births
Living people
Blue Bulls players
Rugby union players from Potchefstroom
South Africa international rugby union players
South African rugby union players
Rugby union props